Stormblåst (English: Stormblown) is the second studio album by Norwegian black metal band Dimmu Borgir. It was released on 25 January 1996 through Cacophonous Records, re-released in 2001 by Century Media, and completely re-recorded in 2005, released as Stormblåst MMV (see below).

This album was Dimmu Borgir's last album sung entirely in the band's native language of Norwegian, as they would after change to English.

This is also the first album where Tjodalv switched to drums as opposed to guitar, the first where  Shagrath is on vocals and the last where lyrics would be written by Aldrahn (of Dødheimsgard and Ved Buens Ende) until 2003's Death Cult Armageddon, and the last album to feature Brynjard Tristan on bass guitar.

More keyboards were employed for this album than previously by the band, and the guitars and bass became more musically textured.

Stormblåst (Original release)

The intro to "Guds fortapelse" is from Dvořák's Symphony no. 9 in E minor, Op. 95 From the New World.

The song "Sorgens Kammer" was plagiarized by keyboardist at the time, Stian Aarstad, from the title track of the Amiga game Agony.  As a result, the song was left out of their re-recording of Stormblåst. The same thing applies for the intro to "Alt lys er svunnet hen", which plagiarized the song "Sacred Hour" by Magnum.

Critical reception

AllMusic's review was unfavourable: "Lengthy, melancholy piano instrumentals, too many mid-paced tempos and an overabundance of goth-flavoured synth mush will test the patience of those looking for a more visceral approach..."

Track listing

Stormblåst MMV

Stormblåst MMV (sometimes referred to as Stormblåst 2005 Version or Stormblåst Re-Recorded) is the seventh album by Norwegian black metal band Dimmu Borgir, released on 11 November 2005 by Nuclear Blast. It features re-recorded songs of the band's 1996 album Stormblåst. The album was re-recorded entirely by Silenoz and Shagrath with guest appearances from Hellhammer and Mustis. The album also has two new studio tracks, "Sorgens Kammer – Del II" and "Avmaktslave". The album included a bonus DVD with five live songs performed at Ozzfest 2004 and the American version included a free cloth patch.

Removal of material
The instrumental "Sorgens Kammer" from the original album could not be re-recorded due to copyright issues associated with the 1992 Amiga game Agony, as then-keyboardist Stian Aarstad had passed the song off as his own. Similarly, for the intro to "Alt Lys Er Svunnet Hen", Aarstad used parts from the Magnum song Sacred Hour; for this reason, the intro is not part of the song on this re-recorded version.

Track listing

Personnel

Original release 
Dimmu Borgir
 Erkekjetter Silenoz – lead vocals, rhythm guitar 
 Shagrath –  lead guitar, backing vocals
 Brynjard Tristan – bass guitar
 Stian Aarstad – keyboards; synthesizers, and piano
 Tjodalv – drums

Additional personnel
 Christophe Szpajdel – logo

2005 Rerecording 
 Shagrath – lead vocals; guitars, bass guitar
 Silenoz – rhythm guitar; backing vocals, lead guitar, bass guitar
 Mustis – keyboards; piano
 Hellhammer – drums

Members featured in bonus DVD
 Galder – lead guitar
 ICS Vortex – bass guitar, clean vocals
 Tony Laureano – drums

References 

1996 albums
Century Media Records albums
Dimmu Borgir albums
Nuclear Blast albums
Cacophonous Records albums
Norwegian-language albums
Albums involved in plagiarism controversies